"Against the Wall" is a song by South African rock band Seether. It was their third single from their seventh album, Poison the Parish. As of August 2018, it had peaked number 19 on the Billboard Mainstream Rock Songs chart.

Background
The song was released as the third single from their sixth studio album Poison the Parish in April 2018. Alternate from the studio and single release, the band also released a separate acoustic recording of the song as well. The acoustic version features frontman Shaun Morgan on vocals and Sevendust's Clint Lowery on acoustic guitar, who has served as a touring member of the band when not active with Sevendust. A music video of the acoustic version of the song was released as well, featuring Morgan and Lowery performing the song in the studio in black and white.

Themes and composition
The song was described as a mid-tempo rock song similar to the work of the Foo Fighters. The studio and single version of the song features a dense, layered production of electric guitars, bass guitar, and drums, while the separate acoustic recording is a more mellow, sparse production of just rough vocals and acoustic guitar.

Personnel
Album/single version
Shaun Morgan – lead vocals, guitar
Dale Stewart – bass, backing vocals
John Humphrey – drums

Acoustic version
Shaun Morgan – vocals
Clint Lowery – guitar

Charts

References

2017 songs
2018 singles
Seether songs
Songs written by Shaun Morgan